Kruize Alshaude Zah-Kee Pinkins (born January 25, 1993) is an American professional basketball player who plays for Scafati Basket of the Lega Basket Serie A.

High school and college career 
Pinkins started his basketball career when he played for the team of the high school he attended, the Marianna High School. He then played in the following years, between 2011 and 2015, at the universities of Chipola College and later played in San Francisco Dons's basketball team.

Professional career 

After playing 32 games for the French team Limoges CSP, on July 9, 2022 Pinkins signed for Scafati Basket of the Italian Lega Basket Serie A. He made his debut with the team on October 2, 2022, when he scored 11 points and got 11 rebounds in 1 minutes in a loss against Reyer Venezia.

References

External links 

 Kruize Pinkins, on Legabasket.it, Lega Basket.
 Kruize Pinkins, on Basketball-reference.com, Sports Reference LLC.
 Kruize Pinkins (NCAA), on Sports-reference.com, Sports Reference LLC.
 Kruize Pinkins, on eurobasket.com, Eurobasket Inc.
 Kruize Pinkins, on realgm.com, RealGM LLC.
 Kruize Pinkins, on LegaPallacanestro.com, Lega Nazionale Pallacanestro.

1993 births
Living people
Scafati Basket players
Limoges CSP players
Basket Torino players
Mitteldeutscher BC players
White Wings Hanau players
Power forwards (basketball)
Sportspeople from Florida